Colussa or Koloussa was an ancient Greek city on the Black Sea coast of ancient Paphlagonia.

Its site is located near Güllüsu in Sinop Province, Turkey.

References

Populated places in ancient Paphlagonia
Former populated places in Turkey
History of Sinop Province
Ancient Greek archaeological sites in Turkey